

Wattle Range is a locality in the Australian state of South Australia located in the state’s south-east about  south-east of the state capital of Adelaide and about  north-east of the municipal seat in Millicent.

Wattle Range’s boundaries were created on 18 December 1997 for the “local established name” which is derived from the Wattle Range Community Centre which is located in the adjoining locality of Wattle Range East.  The locality’s boundaries align with following existing roads and drains.  Clay Wells Road, and Lde Road (sic) to the north, a section of the Grey Riddoch Drain to the north-east, Manga Road to the east, the Reedy Creek B13 Drain and the Mount Burr Road in the south, and O’neills Lane to the west.

Land use within Wattle Range is zoned as primary production with the exception of land dedicated as the Calectasia Conservation Park in the locality’s north-east corner.

The 2016 Australian census which was conducted in August 2016 reports that Wattle Range had a population of 72 people.

Wattle Range is located within the federal division of Barker, the state electoral district of MacKillop and the local government area of the Wattle Range Council.

References

 

Towns in South Australia
Limestone Coast